Caitlin Kalinowski is an American product designer and mechanical engineer. She is the head of hardware at virtual reality technology company Oculus VR.

Personal life 
Caitlin Kalinowski grew up in New Hampshire. She moved to the west coast, and began attending Stanford University to study product design. Her parents were both professors. She lives in San Francisco, California.

Kalinowski is involved with various women's and lesbians' technology groups focused on increasing awareness and resources for women in the technology fields. She is on the board of wogrammer, a project focused on sharing interviews of women engineers, and the advisory board of Lesbians Who Tech.

Career 
After three years at Stanford University, Kalinowski left to begin working at OQO, where she worked on the OQO model 02. She later left OQO for Apple, where she worked as a technical lead on the design of laptops in the MacBook product line. While continuing to work half-time at Apple, she returned to Stanford and in 2007 received her bachelor's degree in mechanical engineering. She left Apple to work at Facebook, where she worked on the Facebook Bluetooth Beacon project. After Facebook acquired Oculus VR, Kalinowski joined the company as the head of product design. In 2018 she became the acting head of hardware for Oculus, where she works on the Oculus Go, Santa Cruz prototype, Oculus Rift and the other virtual reality products developed by the company.

In 2018 she was listed as one of the most powerful female engineers by Business Insider.

She was a featured speaker at WISMP Summit 2018, held in San Francisco on February 3, 2018.

In 2021 and 2022, she was included on the Fast Company Queer 50 list.

References 

Year of birth missing (living people)
Living people
Facebook employees
LGBT people from New Hampshire
Lesbians
Stanford University alumni
American mechanical engineers
Apple Inc. employees
American women engineers
Engineers from New Hampshire
21st-century LGBT people
21st-century American women